Bruno Martins de Jesus (born 21 July 1986), known simply as Bruno Martins, is a Brazilian retired footballer who played as a midfielder. From 2014 until 2016 he had his only experience outside Brazil playing in Romania for Liga I club ASA Târgu Mureș and Liga II club Academica Clinceni.

References

1986 births
Living people
Brazilian footballers
Association football midfielders
Campeonato Brasileiro Série A players
Liga I players
Liga II players
Santos FC players
Paulista Futebol Clube players
Ituano FC players
Esporte Clube São José players
Clube de Regatas Brasil players
ASA 2013 Târgu Mureș players
LPS HD Clinceni players
Brazilian expatriate footballers
Expatriate footballers in Romania
Brazilian expatriate sportspeople in Romania
Sportspeople from Santos, São Paulo